Downtown is the central business district of Roanoke, Virginia, United States. Located geographically at the center of the city, Downtown began its development with the completion of the Shenandoah Valley Railroad in 1882. Today the Downtown core is noted as the center of business for the Roanoke Valley and Southwest Virginia, the Roanoke City Market, the Roanoke Downtown Historic District and many other attractions and amenities.

Location
Geographically, downtown Roanoke is defined by the city as the area bound by Interstate 581 on the east, 5th Street to the west, the Norfolk and Western railroad tracks to the north and Day Avenue to the south. This area is the location of the central core and the historic Market District. An additional section of downtown is located south of Day Avenue, bound to the east by the Roy L. Webber Expressway, South Jefferson Street to the west and Albemarle Avenue to the south. This area is the location of the former Carilion Community Hospital and the Jefferson College of Health Sciences.

Downtown borders the neighborhoods of the West End on the west, Belmont on the east, Gainsboro on the north and both Old Southwest and South Jefferson on the south.

History
The initial establishment of the Gainesborough in 1835 was located to the northeast of present-day downtown. The first structures constructed in what is now downtown occurred in the period following the completion of the Virginia and Tennessee Railroad line in 1852 to the south of Gainesborough. Now known as Big Lick, during the period of reconstruction following the American Civil War, the rail infrastructure was restored and the first municipal structure completed in present-day downtown was a jail.

By 1881 the Shenandoah Valley Railroad announced that Big Lick would be the southern terminus of its line resulting in the rapid growth and development of the community. With the arrival of the railroad, Big Lick would incorporate as the city of Roanoke in 1882. The rapid growth resulted in the citizens passing a $90,000 bond in 1886 to provide for the infrastructure to support the growing community. With the adequate infrastructure in place, downtown would see a rapid expansion from the area around the present-day Campbell Avenue/Jefferson Street intersection outward.

During the period between the wars, Downtown would continue to prosper and expand outwards. Many new structures were constructed in a variety of contemporary styles. Some of the notable structures completed during this period include the nine-story Boxley Building in 1921, the eleven-story Patrick Henry Hotel in 1925 and the twelve-story Colonial National Bank in 1927, which stood as the city's tallest through the 1970s. The downtown core would continue to see growth and prosperity through the period immediately following World War II  and into the 1950s.

With the opening of Crossroads Mall in 1961, more shops would close their Downtown doors, with more people choosing to shop outside the city center. Although declining as a retail destination, the 1970s saw a construction boom resulting in a reshaping of the skyline. Both the thirteen-story Crestar Bank Building (now the BB&T Bank Building) and the sixteen-story First National Exchange Bank Building (now the Carilion Administrative Services Building) were completed in 1973 and the fourteen-story Poff Federal Building was completed in 1976, with each still prominent features of the downtown cityscape.

Established in 1882, the Roanoke City Market is the oldest continuously operating farmers market in the Commonwealth of Virginia and forms the central gathering place of the Downtown district. By the 1960s the market would begin to decline, hitting its low point in the 1970s. Seen as the key to the revitalization of Downtown, the Design 79 plan was initiated to stimulate the revitalization and redevelopment of the market area. Through its and subsequent plans implementation, the market area was revitalized with the efforts now expanding outside the market area throughout Downtown.

By the early 1990s Downtown would again be reshaped with the completion of both the 21-story Dominion Tower (now the Wells Fargo Tower) in 1991 as the city's tallest structure and the twelve-story Norfolk Southern Building in 1992. By the early 2000s (decade) downtown would experience the conversion of many former office buildings, stores and warehouses into residential living units.

Structures and districts on the National Register

 Boxley Building
 Campbell Avenue Complex
 Colonial National Bank
 Fire Station No. 1
 First National Bank
 Patrick Henry Hotel
 Roanoke City Market Historic District
 Roanoke Downtown Historic District
 Roanoke Downtown Historic District (Boundary Increase)
 Roanoke Warehouse Historic District
 Salem Avenue-Roanoke Automotive Commercial Historic District

Other notable places
 Taubman Museum of Art
 Center in the Square
 Virginia Museum of Transportation
 Wells Fargo Tower

References

External links
 Outlook Roanoke- The Downtown Area Plan
 Downtown Roanoke, Inc.
 Roanoke Farmer's Market

Neighborhoods in Roanoke, Virginia
Roanoke